Raymond Keith "Ray" Hollis (born 30 January 1940) is a former Australian politician (unrelated to another Australian politician, Colin Hollis). Born in London, he migrated to Australia in 1962 as a merchant seaman and worked in a variety of occupations, including a railway worker, cook, paper mill operator, insurance salesman and a position with the Victorian Corrective Services. He later owned a transport and distribution business.

As a member of the Australian Democrats, Hollis contested the 1983 and 1984 federal elections. In 1986, he joined the ALP. He was elected to the Legislative Assembly of Queensland in 1989 as the Labor member for Redcliffe. On 28 July 1998 he became Speaker of the Legislative Assembly. He held the position until 21 July 2005, when he resigned his seat, triggering a by-election.

References

1940 births
Living people
Members of the Queensland Legislative Assembly
Speakers of the Queensland Legislative Assembly
Australian Labor Party members of the Parliament of Queensland
21st-century Australian politicians